The Afterlight is a 2021 British experimental supercut art film directed and assembled by Charlie Shackleton.

Summary 
The film, produced by Catherine Bray, Anthony Ing and Shackleton, and distributed by their studio Loop, consists of scenes of actors from old films who are no longer alive. The only copy of the Afterlight exists on a single 35mm film print, so that every time the film is played it gradually erodes until eventually it will diminish entirely and become a lost film. Featuring cinematography from Robbie Ryan and composed of films from the 1960s or before, the film is entirely in black and white.

Films featured on The Afterlight 
The Asphalt Jungle (1950)
In a Lonely Place (1950)
Late Spring (1949)

Reception 
Jonathan Romney, writing for the British Film Institute, gave a positive review of the Afterlight, stating that "placed together, the images evoke a post-death existence, perfect, poetic and yet irreducibly desolate," and favourably compared the film to the 2010 supercut art installation The Clock. Adrian Hui of the Michigan Daily gave a more mixed review, praising its concept and "seamless [editing] between shots from different films as if they were the same film and pieces of dialogue from different films," but stated that as an experimental film, the Afterlight was "not experimental enough," arguing that the film was "not quite bold enough in pushing the boundaries" of its source material.

Release 
The Afterlight had its world premiere at the BFI London Film Festival on 15 October 2021. , the film has been screened publicly 44 times according to its official website:

Screenings 
15 October 2021: BFI London Film Festival, London, England
17 October 2021: BFI London Film Festival, London, England
6 November 2021: The Brighton Film Festival, Brighton, England
10 November 2021: Leeds International Film Festival, Leeds, England
25 November 2021: Cambridge Film Festival, Cambridge, England
4 March 2022: Campus Theatre, Lewisburg, Pennsylvania, United States
25 March 2022: Ann Arbor Film Festival, Ann Arbor, Michigan, United States
31 March 2022: Copenhagen International Documentary Film Festival, Copenhagen, Denmark
4 May 2022: Prismatic Ground, Queens, New York City, United States
11 May 2022: Chicago Film Society, Chicago, Illinois, United States
14 May 2022: Ragtag Cinema, Columbia, Missouri, United States
16 May 2022: MDFF Selects, Toronto, Canada
19 May 2022: Visuals, Montréal, Canada
22 May 2022: Cleveland Institute of Art, Cleveland, Ohio, United States
24 May 2022: Wexner Center for the Arts, Columbus, Ohio, United States
26 May 2022: Bellwether Series, Amherst, Massachusetts, United States
31 May 2022: George Eastman Museum, Rochester, New York, United States
29 June 2022: BFI London Film Festival, London, England
30 June 2022: King Street Cinema, Ipswich, England
2 July 2022: Docs Ireland, Belfast, Northern Ireland
3 July 2022: Irish Film Institute, Dublin, Ireland
6 July 2022: The Electric, Birmingham, England
10 July 2022: Broadway Cinema, Nottingham, England
14 July 2022: HOME, Manchester, England
17 July 2022: Chapter Arts Centre, Cardiff, Wales
22 July 2022: Watershed, Bristol, England
24 July 2022: Tyneside Cinema, Newcastle upon Tyne, England
27 July 2022: Glasgow Film Theatre, Glasgow, Scotland
29 July 2022: Edinburgh Filmhouse, Edinburgh, Scotland
31 July 2022: Genesis Cinema, London, England
2 August 2022: Roxie Theater, San Francisco, California, United States
7 August 2022: Melbourne International Film Festival, Melbourne, Australia
9 August 2022: Melbourne International Film Festival, Melbourne, Australia
18 August 2022: QAGOMA, Brisbane, Australia
20 August 2022: Art Gallery of New South Wales, Sydney, Australia
23 August 2022: Aero Theatre, Los Angeles, California, United States
17 September 2022: Camden International Film Festival, Camden, Maine, United States
7 October 2022: Refocus Film Festival, Iowa City, Iowa, United States
8 October 2022: Refocus Film Festival, Iowa City, Iowa, United States
15 October 2022: Widescreen Weekend, Bradford, England
21 October 2022: Museum of the Moving Image, Queens, New York, United States
24 October 2022: Yale Film Archive, New Haven, Connecticut, United States
1 November 2022: The Grand Illusion, Seattle, Washington, United States
25 November 2022: Austrian Film Museum, Vienna, Austria

See also 
Bill Morrison - American experimental filmmaker similar in content
List of black-and-white films produced since 1966
Film preservation
nostalgia - 1971 Hollis Frampton film similar in structure

References

External links 

2021 films
2020s British films
British black-and-white films
British contemporary works of art
British documentary films
Collage film
Video art
Non-narrative films
Lost films
Films directed by Charlie Shackleton
Essays about film